Elena Anatolyevna Murzina (born 15 June 1984) is a Russian rhythmic gymnast and Olympic champion.

She competed at the 2004 Summer Olympics in Athens where she received a gold medal in the rhythmic group competition.

Detailed Olympic results

References

1984 births
Living people
Russian rhythmic gymnasts
Gymnasts at the 2004 Summer Olympics
Olympic gymnasts of Russia
Olympic gold medalists for Russia
Sportspeople from Yekaterinburg
Olympic medalists in gymnastics
Medalists at the 2004 Summer Olympics
Ural State Law University alumni
21st-century Russian women